The 1863 Confederate States House of Representatives election in Florida was held on Wednesday, November 4, 1863 to elect the two Confederate States Representatives from the state of Florida, one from each of the state's congressional districts, to represent Florida in the 2nd Confederate States Congress. The election coincided with the elections of other offices, including various state and local elections.

The winning candidate would serve a two-year term in the Confederate States House of Representatives from May 2, 1864, to May 1, 1866.

Background 
Florida seceded from the Union on January 10, 1861 and joined the Confederate States of America. In the 1861 elections, James Baird Dawkins was elected as the C.S. representative for the 1st district, while Robert Benjamin Hilton was elected the C.S. representative for the 2nd district.

Dawkins resigned from Congress on December 8, 1862, with John Marshall Martin winning the 1863 special election to succeed him. Martin did not run for a full term, deciding he was too young to be effective in Congress, opting instead to become an officer in the 9th Florida Infantry in the Army of Northern Virginia.

The candidates for both districts ran unopposed, and their ballots cast for them were not tallied on official results.

District 1

Candidates 

 Samuel St. George Rogers, former state senator

General election

Results

District 2

Candidates 

 Robert Benjamin Hilton, incumbent C.S. representative

General election

Results

Aftermath 
The Confederate States Congress adjourned for the final time on March 18, 1865 and was officially dissolved on May 5, 1865.

See also 

 Confederate States House of Representatives elections, 1863
 1865 United States House of Representatives election in Florida

References

Notes 

1863 elections in North America
Confederate States House of Representatives
1863 in the Confederate States of America
2nd Confederate States Congress
Non-partisan elections
Political history of the Confederate States of America